UOM may refer to:

 Units of measurement
 University of Macedonia, a university in Thessaloniki, Greece
 University of Madras, a university in Tamil Nadu, India
 University of Maine, a university in Orono, Maine, U.S.
 University of Malakand, at Chakdara NWFP Pakistan
 University of Malta, the highest educational institution in Malta
 University of Manchester, a university in Manchester, England, UK
 University of Mauritius, a university in Moka, Mauritius
 University of Melbourne, a university in Melbourne, Australia
 University of Memphis, a university in Memphis, Tennessee, U.S.
 University of Michigan, a university with several colleges in Michigan, U.S.
 University of Mogadishu, a university in Mogadishu, Somalia
 University of Montenegro, the highest educational institution in Montenegro
 University of Moratuwa, a university in Katubedda, Moratuwa, Sri Lanka
 University of Mumbai, a university in Maharashtra, India
 University of Mysore, a university in Mysore, India